The Copper Country Soo League was a minor league baseball league which operated in four Michigan cities in . The league had four teams in their lone season. Three Major League Baseball players, Donie Bush, Fred Luderus, and Pat Paige, are known to have played in the league.

History
The Copper County Soo League began play on May 17, 1905, with the Calumet Aristocrats, Hanock Infants, Lake Linden Lakers and Sault Ste. Marie Soos as charter members of the Class D league. There was a short lived merger of the Copper Country-Soo League and Northern League which began June 1st. The newly formed league was called the Northern Copper Country-Soo League. The first official game took place June 1st between the Duluth and Lake Linden clubs. The merger ended July 28th and the two leagues resumed separate schedules.

The Lake Linden Lakers won the 1905 Copper Country Soo League championship.

On March 18, 1906, the Copper Country Soo League and Northern League re-merged to form the Northern-Copper Country League, beginning play on May 17, 1906. The merged league disbanded following the 1907 season and a reorganized Northern League resumed separate operations in 1908.

Teams
Calumet Aristocrats (Laurium, Michigan)
Hanock Infants (Hancock, Michigan)
Lake Linden Lakers (Lake Linden, Michigan)
Sault Ste. Marie Soos (Sault Ste. Marie, Michigan)

Standings
1905 Copper Country Soo League
Sault Ste. Marie disbanded August 22. June 1st to July 28: Merged into "Northern Copper Country-Soo League". Merger ended July 28th old schedule resumed. Playoff: Lake Linden 4 games, Calumet 0.

References

External links
Baseball-Reference (Minors)

Defunct minor baseball leagues in the United States
Baseball leagues in Michigan
Defunct baseball teams in Michigan
Sports leagues established in 1905
Sports leagues disestablished in 1905